Llanrhystyd Road railway station was located on the Carmarthen to Aberystwyth Line, originally called the Manchester and Milford Railway, before being transferred to the GWR.

History
The station opened in August 1867 to serve the village of Llanrhystyd which was nearly seven miles southwards on the Fishguard road A487 hence the Road suffix.  The station closed in December 1964 when services were truncated at Strata Florida, following flood damage by the River Ystwyth to the line one mile east of Llanilar. Formal closure was confirmed two months later. The station had a single platform, a small shelter, a ground frame, and a goods passing loop. The station had a simple corrugated iron shelter and a signal box on the single platform.

References
Notes

Sources

Further reading
 Holden, J.S. (1979, revised 2nd edition 2007): The Manchester & Milford Railway, Oakwood Press,

External links
 Video of the station
 Station map

Disused railway stations in Ceredigion
Former Great Western Railway stations
Beeching closures in Wales
Railway stations in Great Britain opened in 1867
Railway stations in Great Britain closed in 1964